Adam Marjoram (born 31 May 1993 in Perth) is a racing driver from Australia. He currently competes in the Super2 Series for Image Racing.

Career results

References

Australian racing drivers
1993 births
Living people
Matt Stone Racing drivers